The Lombard effect or Lombard reflex is the involuntary tendency of speakers to increase their vocal effort when speaking in loud noise to enhance the audibility of their voice. This change includes not only loudness but also other acoustic features such as pitch, rate, and duration of syllables. This compensation effect maintains the auditory signal-to-noise ratio of the speaker's spoken words.

The effect links to the needs of effective communication, as there is a reduced effect when words are repeated or lists are read where communication intelligibility is not important. Since the effect is involuntary it is used as a means to detect malingering in those simulating hearing loss. Research on birds and monkeys find that the effect also occurs in the vocalizations of animals.

The effect was discovered in 1909 by Étienne Lombard, a French otolaryngologist.

Lombard speech
Listeners hear a speech recorded with background noise better than they hear a speech which has been recorded in quiet with masking noise applied afterwards. This is because changes between normal and Lombard speech include:
 increase in phonetic fundamental frequencies
 shift in energy from low frequency bands to middle or high bands
 increase in sound intensity
 increase in vowel duration
 spectral tilting
 shift in formant center frequencies for F1 (mainly) and F2
 the duration of content words are prolonged to a greater degree in noise than function words
 greater lung volumes are used,
 it is accompanied by larger facial movements, though these do not aid as much as sound changes

These changes cannot be controlled by instructing a person to speak as they would in silence, though people can learn control with feedback.

The Lombard effect also occurs following laryngectomy when people following speech therapy talk with esophageal speech.

Mechanisms

The intelligibility of an individual's own vocalization can be adjusted with audio-vocal reflexes using their own hearing (private loop), or it can be adjusted indirectly in terms of how well listeners can hear the vocalization (public loop). Both processes are involved in the Lombard effect.

Private loop
A speaker can regulate their vocalizations, particularly their amplitude relative to background noise, with reflexive auditory feedback. Such auditory feedback is known to maintain the production of vocalization since deafness affects the vocal acoustics of both humans and songbirds Changing the auditory feedback also changes vocalization in human speech or bird song. Neural circuits have been found in the brainstem that enable such reflex adjustment.

Public loop
A speaker can regulate their vocalizations at higher cognitive level in terms of observing its consequences on their audience's ability to hear it. In this auditory self-monitoring adjusts vocalizations in terms of learnt associations of what features of their vocalization, when made in noise, create effective and efficient communication. The Lombard effect has been found to be greatest upon those words that are important to the listener to understand a speaker suggesting such cognitive effects are important.

Development
Both private and public loop processes exist in children. There is a development shift however from the Lombard effect being linked to acoustic self-monitoring in young children to the adjustment of vocalizations to aid its intelligibility for others in adults.

Neurology
The Lombard effect depends upon audio-vocal neurons in the periolivary region of the superior olivary complex and the adjacent pontine reticular formation. It has been  suggested that the Lombard effect might also involve the higher cortical areas that control these lower brainstem areas.

Choral singing

Choral singers  experience reduced  feedback due to the sound of other singers upon their own voice. This results in a tendency for people in choruses to sing at a louder level if it is not controlled by a conductor. Trained soloists can control this effect but it has been suggested that after a concert they might speak more  loudly in noisy surroundings, such as after-concert parties.

The Lombard effect also occurs to those playing instruments such as the guitar.

Animal vocalization

Noise has been found to affect the vocalizations of animals that vocalize  against a background of human noise pollution.
Experimentally, the Lombard effect has also been found in the vocalization of:
 Budgerigars
 Canaries
 Cats
 Chickens
 Common marmosets
 Cottontop tamarins
 Japanese quail
 Nightingales
 Rhesus macaques
 Squirrel monkey
 Zebra finches
 Beluga whales
 Pale spear-nosed bats
 Túngara frogs

See also
 Acoustic ecology
 Bird vocalization
 Human voice
 Intelligibility (communication)
 Noise health effects
 Noise pollution
 Occlusion effect
 Whale song

References

Phonetics
Human voice
Animal communication
Human communication
Noise pollution